The 1907–08 Northern Rugby Football Union season was the 13th season of rugby league football.

Season summary
League Champions were Hunslet who beat Oldham 12-2 in a replay after a 7-7 draw. It was the first time a team that did not finish top of the league won the Championship.

Challenge Cup Winners were Hunslet who defeated Hull F.C. 14-0.

Liverpool City were replaced by the two Welsh clubs, Merthyr Tydfil and Ebbw Vale, taking the competition to 27 clubs.

Bradford switched to Association Football and were replaced by Bradford Northern.

Oldham won the Lancashire League, and Hunslet won the Yorkshire League. Oldham beat Broughton Rangers 16–9 to win the Lancashire Cup, and Hunslet beat Halifax 17–0 to win the Yorkshire County Cup.

Hunslet won All Four Cups available to them; Challenge Cup, Rugby Football League Championship, Yorkshire league, and Yorkshire County Cup.

New Zealand toured England this season. On 28 December 1907, they defeated Salford 9-2 in front of 9,000 spectators.

Championship

Championship play-off

Challenge Cup

The final saw Hunslet's 14-0 victory over Hull F.C. in the 1908 Challenge Cup Final during the 1907–08 season at Fartown Ground, Huddersfield on Saturday 25 April 1908, in front of a crowd of 18,000, the referee was Mr. J. H. Smith of Widnes, and the Challenge Cup Trophy was presented by Mr H. Ashton (President of the Northern Union).

Hunslet Tries: Fred Smith, Fred Farrar

Hunslet Goals: Billy Eagers, (Albert, or Walter) Goldthorpe 3

Half-time: 7-0

Attendance: 18,000 (at Fartown Ground, Huddersfield)

Teams:

Hunslet: Herbert Place, Fred Farrar, Billy Eagers, Walter Goldthorpe, Billy Batten, Albert Goldthorpe, Fred Smith, Harry Wilson, Bill Brookes, Bill Jukes, John "Jack" Randall, John Higson, Tom Walsh

Hull FC: Harry Taylor, L. Parry, G. T. Cottrell, F. J. Cook, (E. or Ned) Rogers, Harry Wallace, Billie Anderson, Tom Herridge, J. Owen, W. J. Carroll, G. Kilburn, H. Fulton, William Holder

Sources
1907-08 Rugby Football League season at wigan.rlfans.com
The Challenge Cup at The Rugby Football League website

References

1907 in English rugby league
1908 in English rugby league
Northern Rugby Football Union seasons
1907 in Welsh rugby league
1908 in Welsh rugby league